Emor is a portion of the Torah.

Emor may refer to:

 Emor: Rome Upside Down, a 2000 by Les Savy Fav
 Emor L. Calkins (1853–1933), American temperance leader
 Aloisio Emor Ojetuk, governor of Eastern Equatoria State of South Sudan